A Rising Tide is a 2015 American romantic drama film starring Hunter Parrish, Ashley Hinshaw and Tim Daly.

Plot

Cast
Hunter Parrish as Sam
Ashley Hinshaw as Sarah
Tim Daly as Tom Blake
Jonathan Togo as Roger
Nana Visitor as Eva
Victor Slezak as Alek Rama

References

External links
 
 
 A Rising Tide at Wavelength Productions.

2015 films
American romantic drama films
2015 romantic drama films
2010s English-language films
2010s American films